Cold Fell may refer to:

Cold Fell (Calder Bridge), a 293m hill in the west of Cumbria, England
Cold Fell (Pennines), a 621m hill in the north of Cumbria, England